The Game Axe is an unlicensed handheld video game system, made by the Taiwanese hardware manufacturer Legend Technology Co.,LTD (as "REDANT" brand). Launched in 1998 (or 1999), it was sold in Hong Kong, Taiwan, and Japan. It is a portable Famiclone that can play Famicom games, and by using the included adapter, American and European Nintendo Entertainment System games.

Design
The Game Axe is an unofficial hand-held version of the Famicom released in 1998 (or 1999). The design of the Game Axe was horizontal and similar in appearance to Sega's Game Gear. It had a 3.5-inch (FC-812) or 4-inch (FC-816/FC-868) colour LCD screen, two controller ports at the base, an AC jack, and an RCA jack, allowing the Game Axe to essentially replace the Famicom or NES by plugging it into a television.

Issues with the NES cartridge adapter
Due to the necessity of an extra adapter, the Game Axe suffers severe stability issues if playing NES games while holding the device. Any jarring of the hand held causes NES games to lose enough contact to freeze or shut off.

See also
 Nintendo Entertainment System hardware clone
 Pocket Famicom
 Sega Nomad
 TurboExpress

References

External links
 The Game Axe Information Site

Unlicensed Nintendo Entertainment System hardware clones
Handheld game consoles